The European Road Cycling Championships are the set of European championship events for the various disciplines and distances in road cycling and have been regulated by the European Cycling Union since 1995. The championships are for under-23, junior (since 2005) and Elite riders (since 2016). The championships include a road race and an individual time trial since 1997, with women's events shorter than men's and junior's events shorter than under-23's. Championships are open to riders selected by their national cycling governing body. They compete in the colours of their country. As with national road race championships and the UCI Road World Championships, the winners are entitled to wear a special champion's jersey when racing throughout the year; in the case of the European Championship, a white jersey with blue bands and yellow stars, modelled on the flag of Europe, a symbolims and design adopted by both the Council of Europe and the European Union and widely used to represent the continent in sport.

Competitions

All time medal table
As of 28 August 2020.

Men's events

Men's elite road race

Updated after the 2022 European Road Championships

Men's elite time trial

Updated after the 2022 European Road Championships

Men's U23 road race

Updated after the 2022 European Road Championships

Men's U23 time trial

Updated after the 2022 European Road Championships

Women's events

Women's road race

Updated after the 2022 European Road Championships

Women's time trial

Updated after the 2022 European Road Championships

Women's U23 road race 

Updated after the 2022 European Road Championships

Women's U23 time trial

Updated after the 2022 European Road Championships

Mixed events

Mixed time trial relay

Updated after the 2021 European Road Championships

Junior events

Men's junior road race

Men's junior time trial

Women's junior road race

Women's junior time trial

References

Results at the European Cycling Union website
Older results at:
Results men's RR U-23 (cyclingarchives)
Results men's ITT U-23 (cyclingarchives)
Results women's RR U-23 (cyclingarchives)
Results women's ITT U-23 (cyclingarchives)
Results men's RR Juniors (cyclingarchives)
Results men's ITT Juniors (cyclingarchives)
Results women's RR Juniors (cyclingarchives)
Results women's ITT Juniors (cyclingarchives)

External links
European Cycling Union

 
European cycling championships
Road bicycle races